Qudsianematidae is a family of nematodes belonging to the order Dorylaimida.

Genera

Genera:
 Allodorylaimus Andrássy, 1986
 Arctidorylaimus Mulvey & Anderson, 1979
 Baqriella Ahmed & Shamim Jairajpuri, 1988

References

Nematodes